Schloss is a German surname. Notable people with the surname include:

Adolphe Schloss (1842 – 1910), German-French art collector
Andrew Schloss (born 1952), American musician and computer engineer
Eva Schloss (born 1929),  Austrian-English Holocaust survivor, memoirist 
Glenn Schloss (born 1972), American television & film composer, musician, entrepreneur, writer
Irene Schloss, Argentinian  Antarctic researcher, best known for her work on plankton biology
Jeremy Schloss, Rugby player
Patrick Schloss American rehabilitation psychologist, educator, professor and university administrator
Ruth Schloss (1922 – 2013), Israeli painter and illustrator 
Walter Schloss  (1916-2012), American investor, fund manager, and philanthropist
Zander Schloss (born August 7, 1961) is an American musician, actor and composer

Lists of people by surname